Andrew George Puttick (born 11 December 1980) is a retired South African cricketer.

A left-handed opening batsman, Puttick represented South Africa at the 1996 Lombard Under-15 Challenge Cup in England and the 2000 Under-19 World Cup in Sri Lanka. After making his first class debut in 2000–01, he immediately made an impact with a century in his third game, against Easterns at Newlands. He played for Western Province and Cape Cobras in domestic cricket and had a highest score of 250 not out.

International career
Puttick toured Sri Lanka with South Africa A in 2003 and returned there in 2004 but this time with the national squad. Replacing Herschelle Gibbs, he remained on the sidelines all tour and had to wait until the following year for his international debut. He eventually made his ODI debut for the Proteas against New Zealand in Cape Town on 28 October 2005.

Domestic career
On 10 October 2009, Puttick scored 104 not out for Cape Cobras against the Otago Volts in the 2009 Champions League Twenty20 and in doing so became the first ever batsman to score a century in Champions League T20 history. In the same month, he made 122 against the Highveld Lions in the inaugural match of the MTN 40.

Puttick achieved the rare feat of scoring a century in his final first class innings in March 2018.

Coaching career
In August 2019, Puttick was named South Africa A Men's Team Assistant Coach.

References

External links
 

1980 births
Living people
South African cricketers
South Africa One Day International cricketers
Cape Cobras cricketers
Western Province cricketers
Cricketers from Cape Town
Alumni of Rondebosch Boys' High School